Billboard Top Hits: 1990 is a compilation album released by Rhino Records in 2000, featuring ten hit recordings from 1990.

The track lineup includes four songs that reached the top of the Billboard Hot 100 chart, including the No. 1 song of 1990, "Hold On" by Wilson Phillips. The remaining songs all reached the top five of the Hot 100.

Track listing

Track information and credits taken from the album's liner notes.

References

2000 compilation albums
Billboard Top Hits albums